Blank Studio Architecture is an architectural practice based in Phoenix, Arizona. The practice was founded in 2006 by Matthew Trzebiatowski, AIA. The work of Blank Studio Architecture has been compared to the likes of Le Corbusier and Mies van der Rohe because of their use of material and volume. Their works focus on the sensual qualities found in architecture, such as interplay of natural and artificial illumination, and unconventional uses of material. Projects consistently display a phenomenological approach to design.

The studio has partnered with University of Arizona and The School of Architecture at Taliesin to provide students with the opportunity to learn about the study of architecture through practice. Students work on the studio's active architectural projects and gain exposure to all phases of the work through this collaboration.

Works 

The firm's most recognizable project is the Xeros Residence, 2006. It has had a strong presence in the architectural press. Most notably Dwell, Detail, GA, Corrugated Iron: Building on the Frontier and Phoenix 21st Century. In 2013 it was showcased on HGTV's Extreme Homes.
The residence was awarded the distinction of Record House (2006) by Architectural Record, has been awarded honors from the American Institute of Architects (2006), and Project of the Year by Residential Architect Magazine (2008).

Selected other works
Blue Clay Country Spa (Shortlist Finalist, 2017)
Jacaranda Avenue (Competition, First Place, 2016)
House of Writing (Invited Competition, 2013)
"T" House (Construction Documents, 2013)
Tongzhou Wenyu River Project (Invited Competition, 2012)
Littles Road Residence (Under Construction)
Yoga Deva, 2009,
Superior Social Condenser, 2008

References

External links
 Blank Studio Design+Architecture website

21st-century American architects
1972 establishments in Arizona
University of Wisconsin–Milwaukee alumni
Architecture firms based in Arizona
Companies based in Phoenix, Arizona
Architecture firms of the United States